This list of birds of Metropolitan France includes a total of 611 species according to oiseaux.net with supplemental additions from Avibase. Of them, 234 are accidental and 12 have been introduced by humans. One is endemic to the island of Corsica.

Metropolitan France is the French mainland, adjacent islands, and Corsica. There is also a specific list for the birds of Corsica. For the birds in the French Overseas territories, see: List of birds of French Guiana, List of birds of French Polynesia, List of birds of Guadeloupe, List of birds of Martinique, List of birds of Réunion, and List of birds of Saint Pierre and Miquelon.

This list's taxonomic treatment (designation and sequence of orders, families and species) and nomenclature (English and scientific names) are those of The Clements Checklist of Birds of the World, 2022 edition. French names are from oiseaux.net.

The following tags have been used to highlight some categories of occurrence; the tags are from Bird Checklists of the World and the Clements taxonomy.

(A) Accidental - a species that rarely or accidentally occurs in France
(I) Introduced - a species introduced to France as a consequence, direct or indirect, of human actions, and has become established

Ducks, geese, and waterfowl
Order: AnseriformesFamily: Anatidae

Anatidae includes the ducks and most duck-like waterfowl, such as geese and swans. These birds are adapted to an aquatic existence with webbed feet, flattened bills, and feathers that are excellent at shedding water due to an oily coating.

 Snow goose, Anser caerulescens (oie des neiges) (A)
 Graylag goose, Anser anser (oie cendrée)
 Greater white-fronted goose, Anser albifrons (oie rieuse)
 Lesser white-fronted goose, Anser erythropus (oie naine) (A)
 Taiga bean-goose, Anser fabalis (oie des moissons)
 Tundra bean-goose, Anser serrirostris(Oie de la toundra)
 Pink-footed goose, Anser brachyrhynchus (oie à bec court) (A)
 Brant, Branta bernicla (bernache cravant)
 Barnacle goose, Branta leucopsis (bernache nonnette)
 Canada goose, Branta canadensis (bernache du Canada) (I)
 Red-breasted goose, Branta ruficollis (bernache à cou roux) (A)
 Mute swan, Cygnus olor (cygne tuberculé)
 Black swan, Cygnus atratus  (Cygne noir) (I)
 Tundra swan, Cygnus columbianus (cygne siffleur)
 Whooper swan, Cygnus cygnus (cygne chanteur)
 Egyptian goose, Alopochen aegyptiaca (ouette d'Egypte) (I)
 Ruddy shelduck, Tadorna ferruginea (tadorne casarca) (A)
 Common shelduck, Tadorna tadorna (tadorne de Belon)
 Mandarin duck, Aix galericulata (canard mandarin) (I)
 Baikal teal, Sibirionetta formosa (sarcelle élégante) (A)
 Garganey, Spatula querquedula (sarcelle d'été)
 Blue-winged teal, Spatula discors (sarcelle à ailes bleues) (A)
 Northern shoveler, Spatula clypeata (canard souchet)
 Gadwall, Mareca strepera (canard chipeau)
 Eurasian wigeon, Mareca penelope (canard siffleur)
 American wigeon, Mareca americana (canard d'Amérique) (A)
 Mallard, Anas platyrhynchos (canard colvert)
 American black duck, Anas rubripes (canard noir) (A)
 Northern pintail, Anas acuta (canard pilet)
 Eurasian teal, Anas crecca (sarcelle d'hiver)
 Green-winged teal, Anas carolinensis (A) (sarcelle à ailes vertes)
 Marbled teal, Marmaronetta angustirostris (sarcelle marbrée)
 Red-crested pochard, Netta rufina (nette rousse)
 Redhead, Aythya americana (fuligule à tête rouge) (A)
 Common pochard, Aythya ferina (fuligule milouin)
 Ring-necked duck, Aythya collaris (fuligule à collier) (A)
 Ferruginous duck, Aythya nyroca (fuligule nyroca)
 Tufted duck, Aythya fuligula (fuligule morillon)
 Greater scaup, Aythya marila (fuligule milouinan)
 Lesser scaup, Aythya affinis (petit Fuligule) (A)
 Steller's eider, Polysticta stelleri (eider de Steller) (A)
 King eider, Somateria spectabilis (eider à tête grise) (A)
 Common eider, Somateria mollissima (eider à duvet)
 Surf scoter, Melanitta perspicillata (macreuse à front blanc) (A)
 Velvet scoter, Melanitta fusca (macreuse brune)
 Stejneger's scoter, Melanitta stejnegeri  (Macreuse de Sibérie)
 Common scoter, Melanitta nigra (macreuse noire)
 Black scoter, Melanitta americana (macreuse à bec jaune) (A)
 Long-tailed duck, Clangula hyemalis (harelde kakawi)
 Bufflehead, Bucephala albeola (garrot albéole) (A)
 Common goldeneye, Bucephala clangula (garrot à oeil d'or)
 Barrow's goldeneye, Bucephala islandica (garrot d'Islande) (A)
 Smew, Mergellus albellus (harle piette)
 Common merganser, Mergus merganser (harle bièvre)
 Red-breasted merganser, Mergus serrator (harle huppé)
 Ruddy duck, Oxyura jamaicensis (érismature rousse) (I)
 White-headed duck, Oxyura leucocephala (érismature à tête blanche) (A)

New World quail
Order: GalliformesFamily: Odontophoridae

The New World quails are small, plump terrestrial birds only distantly related to the quails of the Old World, but named for their similar appearance and habits.

 California quail, Callipepla californica (colin de Californie) (I)

Pheasants, grouse, and allies
Order: GalliformesFamily: Phasianidae

These are terrestrial species of gamebirds, feeding and nesting on the ground. They are variable in size but generally plump, with broad and relatively short wings.

 Hazel grouse, Tetrastes bonasia (gélinotte des bois)
 Rock ptarmigan, Lagopus muta (lagopède alpin)
 Western capercaillie, Tetrao urogallus (grand Tétras)
 Black grouse, Lyrurus tetrix (tétras lyre)
 Gray partridge, Perdix perdix (perdrix grise
 Reeves's pheasant, Syrmaticus reevesii (faisan vénéré) (I)
 Ring-necked pheasant, Phasianus colchicus (faisan de Colchide) (I)
 Common quail, Coturnix coturnix (caille des blés)
 Barbary partridge, Alectoris barbara (Perdrix gambra ) (I)
 Red-legged partridge, Alectoris rufa (perdrix rouge) 
 Rock partridge, Alectoris graeca (perdrix bartavelle)

Flamingos
Order: PhoenicopteriformesFamily: Phoenicopteridae

Flamingos filter-feed on shellfish and algae. Their oddly shaped beaks are specially adapted to separate mud and silt from the food they consume and, uniquely, are used upside-down.

 Greater flamingo, Phoenicopterus roseus (flamant rose) (A)
 Lesser flamingo, Phoeniconaias minor (Flamant nain) (A)

Grebes
Order: PodicipediformesFamily: Podicipedidae

Grebes are small to medium-large freshwater diving birds. They have lobed toes and are excellent swimmers and divers. However, they have their feet placed far back on the body, making them quite ungainly on land.

 Little grebe, Tachybaptus ruficollis (grèbe castagneux)
 Pied-billed grebe, Podilymbus podiceps (grèbe à bec bigarré) (A)
 Horned grebe, Podiceps auritus (grèbe esclavon)
 Red-necked grebe, Podiceps grisegena (grèbe jougris)
 Great crested grebe, Podiceps cristatus (grèbe huppé)
 Eared grebe, Podiceps nigricollis (grèbe à cou noir)

Pigeons and doves
Order: ColumbiformesFamily: Columbidae

Pigeons and doves are stout-bodied birds with short necks and short slender bills with a fleshy cere.

 Rock pigeon, Columba livia (pigeon biset)
 Stock dove, Columba oenas (pigeon colombin)
 Common wood-pigeon, Columba palumbus (pigeon ramier)
 European turtle-dove, Streptopelia turtur (tourterelle des bois)
 Oriental turtle-dove, Streptopelia orientalis  (tourterelle orientale) (A)
 Eurasian collared-dove, Streptopelia decaocto (tourterelle turque)

Sandgrouse
Order: PterocliformesFamily: Pteroclidae

Sandgrouse have small pigeon-like heads and necks, but sturdy compact bodies. They have long pointed wings and sometimes tails and a fast direct flight. Flocks fly to watering holes at dawn and dusk. Their legs are feathered down to the toes.

 Pallas's sandgrouse, Syrrhaptes paradoxus (syrrhapte paradoxal) (A)
 Pin-tailed sandgrouse, Pterocles alchata (ganga cata)

Bustards
Order: OtidiformesFamily: Otididae

Bustards are large terrestrial birds mainly associated with dry open country and steppes in the Old World. They are omnivorous and nest on the ground. They walk steadily on strong legs and big toes, pecking for food as they go. They have long broad wings with "fingered" wingtips and striking patterns in flight. Many have interesting mating displays.

 Great bustard, Otis tarda (grande Outarde) (A)
 Macqueen's bustard, Chlamydotis macqueenii (outarde de Macqueen) (A)
 Little bustard, Tetrax tetrax (outarde canepetière)

Cuckoos
Order: CuculiformesFamily: Cuculidae

The family Cuculidae includes cuckoos, roadrunners, and anis. These birds are of variable size with slender bodies, long tails, and strong legs. The Old World cuckoos are brood parasites.

 Great spotted cuckoo, Clamator glandarius (coucou geai)
 Yellow-billed cuckoo, Coccyzus americanus (coulicou à bec jaune) (A)
 Black-billed cuckoo, Coccyzus erythropthalmus (coulicou à bec noir) (A)
 Common cuckoo, Cuculus canorus (coucou gris)

Nightjars and allies
Order: CaprimulgiformesFamily: Caprimulgidae

Nightjars are medium-sized nocturnal birds that usually nest on the ground. They have long wings, short legs, and very short bills. Most have small feet, of little use for walking, and long pointed wings. Their soft plumage is camouflaged to resemble bark or leaves.

 Common nighthawk, Chordeiles minor (engoulevent d'Amérique) (A)
 Red-necked nightjar, Caprimulgus ruficollis (engoulevent à collier roux) (A)
 Eurasian nightjar, Caprimulgus europaeus (engoulevent d'Europe)

Swifts
Order: CaprimulgiformesFamily: Apodidae

Swifts are small birds which spend the majority of their lives flying. These birds have very short legs and never settle voluntarily on the ground, perching instead only on vertical surfaces. Many swifts have long swept-back wings which resemble a crescent or boomerang.

 Chimney swift, Chaetura pelagica (martinet ramoneur)
 Alpine swift, Apus melba (martinet à ventre blanc)
 Common swift, Apus apus (martinet noir)
 Pallid swift, Apus pallidus (martinet pâle)
 Little swift, Apus affinis (martinet des maisons) (A)
 White-rumped swift, Apus caffer (martinet cafre) (A)

Rails, gallinules, and coots
Order: GruiformesFamily: Rallidae

Rallidae is a large family of small to medium-sized birds which includes the rails, crakes, coots, and gallinules. Typically they inhabit dense vegetation in damp environments near lakes, swamps, or rivers. In general they are shy and secretive birds, making them difficult to observe. Most species have strong legs and long toes which are well adapted to soft uneven surfaces. They tend to have short, rounded wings and to be weak fliers.

 Water rail, Rallus aquaticus (râle d'eau)
 Corn crake, Crex crex (râle des genêts)
 Sora, Porzana carolina (marouette de Caroline) (A)
 Spotted crake, Porzana porzana (marouette ponctuée)
 Eurasian moorhen, Gallinula chloropus (poule d'eau)
 Eurasian coot, Fulica atra (foulque macroule)
 Red-knobbed coot, Fulica cristata (foulque à crête) (A)
 Allen's gallinule, Porphyrio alleni (talève d'Allen) (A)
 Western swamphen, Porphyrio porphyrio (talève sultane)
 Little crake, Zapornia parva (marouette poussin)
 Baillon's crake, Zapornia pusilla (marouette de Baillon) (A)

Cranes
Order: GruiformesFamily: Gruidae

Cranes are large, long-legged, and long-necked birds. Unlike the similar-looking but unrelated herons, cranes fly with necks outstretched, not pulled back. Most have elaborate and noisy courting displays or "dances".

 Demoiselle crane, Grus virgo (grue demoiselle) (A)
 Sandhill crane, Antigone canadensis (grue du Canada) (A)
 Common crane, Grus grus (grue cendrée)

Thick-knees
Order: CharadriiformesFamily: Burhinidae

The thick-knees are a group of waders found worldwide within the tropical zone, with some species also breeding in temperate Europe and Australia. They are medium to large waders with strong black or yellow-black bills, large yellow eyes, and cryptic plumage. Despite being classed as waders, most species have a preference for arid or semi-arid habitats.

 Eurasian thick-knee, Burhinus oedicnemus (œdicnème criard)

Stilts and avocets
Order: CharadriiformesFamily: Recurvirostridae

Recurvirostridae is a family of large wading birds which includes the avocets and stilts. The avocets have long legs and long up-curved bills. The stilts have extremely long legs and long, thin, straight bills.

 Black-winged stilt, Himantopus himantopus (échasse blanche)
 Pied avocet, Recurvirostra avosetta (avocette élégante)

Oystercatchers
Order: CharadriiformesFamily: Haematopodidae

The oystercatchers are large and noisy plover-like birds, with strong bills used for smashing or prising open molluscs.

 Eurasian oystercatcher, Haematopus ostralegus (huîtrier pie)

Plovers and lapwings
Order: CharadriiformesFamily: Charadriidae

The family Charadriidae includes the plovers, dotterels, and lapwings. They are small to medium-sized birds with compact bodies, short thick necks, and long, usually pointed, wings. They are found in open country worldwide, mostly in habitats near water.

 Black-bellied plover, Pluvialis squatarola (pluvier argenté)
 European golden-plover, Pluvialis apricaria (pluvier doré)
 American golden-plover, Pluvialis dominica (pluvier bronzé) (A)
 Pacific golden-plover, Pluvialis fulva (pluvier fauve) (A)
 Northern lapwing, Vanellus vanellus (vanneau huppé)
 Spur-winged lapwing, Vanellus spinosus (vanneau éperonné) (A)
 Sociable lapwing, Vanellus gregarius (vanneau sociable) (A)
 White-tailed lapwing, Vanellus leucurus (vanneau à queue blanche) (A)
 Lesser sand-plover, Charadrius mongolus (pluvier de Mongolie) (A)
 Greater sand-plover, Charadrius leschenaultii (pluvier de Leschenault) (A)
 Caspian plover, Charadrius asiaticus (pluvier asiatique) (A)
 Kittlitz's plover, Charadrius pecuarius (pluvier pâtre) (A)
 Kentish plover, Charadrius alexandrinus (pluvier à collier interrompu)
 Common ringed plover, Charadrius hiaticula (pluvier grand-gravelot)
 Semipalmated plover, Charadrius semipalmatus (pluvier grand-semipalmé) (A)
 Little ringed plover, Charadrius dubius (pluvier petit-gravelot)
 Killdeer, Charadrius vociferus (pluvier kildir) (A)
 Eurasian dotterel, Charadrius morinellus (pluvier guignard)

Sandpipers and allies
Order: CharadriiformesFamily: Scolopacidae

Scolopacidae is a large diverse family of small to medium-sized shorebirds including the sandpipers, curlews, godwits, shanks, tattlers, woodcocks, snipes, dowitchers, and phalaropes. The majority of these species eat small invertebrates picked out of the mud or soil. Variation in length of legs and bills enables multiple species to feed in the same habitat, particularly on the coast, without direct competition for food.

 Upland sandpiper, Bartramia longicauda (maubèche des champs) (A)
 Eurasian whimbrel, Numenius phaeopus (courlis corlieu)
 Hudsonian whimbrel, Numenius hudsonicus (courlis hudsonien) (A)
 Slender-billed curlew, Numenius tenuirostris (courlis à bec grêle) (A)
 Eurasian curlew, Numenius arquata (courlis cendré)
 Bar-tailed godwit, Limosa lapponica (barge rousse)
 Black-tailed godwit, Limosa limosa (barge à queue noire)
 Ruddy turnstone, Arenaria interpres (tournepierre à collier)
 Red knot, Calidris canutus (bécasseau maubèche)
 Ruff, Calidris pugnax (combattant varié)
 Broad-billed sandpiper, Calidris falcinellus (bécasseau falcinelle) (A)
 Sharp-tailed sandpiper, Calidris acuminata (bécasseau à queue pointue) (A)
 Stilt sandpiper, Calidris himantopus (bécasseau à échasses) (A)
 Curlew sandpiper, Calidris ferruginea (bécasseau cocorli)
 Temminck's stint, Calidris temminckii (bécasseau de Temminck)
 Long-toed stint, Calidris subminuta (bécasseau à longs doigts) (A)
 Red-necked stint, Calidris ruficollis (bécasseau à cou roux) (A)
 Sanderling, Calidris alba (bécasseau sanderling)
 Dunlin, Calidris alpina (bécasseau variable)
 Purple sandpiper, Calidris maritima (bécasseau violet)
 Baird's sandpiper, Calidris bairdii (bécasseau de Baird) (A)
 Little stint, Calidris minuta (bécasseau minute)
 Least sandpiper, Calidris minutilla (bécasseau minuscule) (A)
 White-rumped sandpiper, Calidris fuscicollis (bécasseau à croupion blanc) (A)
 Buff-breasted sandpiper, Calidris subruficollis (bécasseau rousset) (A)
 Pectoral sandpiper, Calidris melanotos (bécasseau tacheté)
 Semipalmated sandpiper, Calidris pusilla (bécasseau semipalmé) (A)
 Western sandpiper, Calidris mauri (bécasseau d'Alaska) (A)
 Short-billed dowitcher, Limnodromus griseus (bécassin roux) (A)
 Long-billed dowitcher, Limnodromus scolopaceus (bécassin à long bec) (A)
 Jack snipe, Lymnocryptes minimus (bécassine sourde)
 Eurasian woodcock, Scolopax rusticola (bécasse des bois)
 American woodcock, Scolopax minor (bécasse d'Amérique) (A)
 Great snipe, Gallinago media (bécassine double) (A)
 Common snipe, Gallinago gallinago (bécassine des marais)
 Wilson's snipe, Gallinago delicata (bécassine de Wilson) (A)
 Terek sandpiper, Xenus cinereus (chevalier bargette) (A)
 Wilson's phalarope, Phalaropus tricolor (phalarope de Wilson) (A)
 Red-necked phalarope, Phalaropus lobatus (phalarope à bec étroit)
 Red phalarope, Phalaropus fulicaria (phalarope à bec large)
 Common sandpiper, Actitis hypoleucos (chevalier guignette)
 Spotted sandpiper, Actitis macularius (chevalier grivelé) (A)
 Green sandpiper, Tringa ochropus (chevalier cul-blanc)
 Solitary sandpiper, Tringa solitaria (chevalier solitaire) (A)
 Spotted redshank, Tringa erythropus (chevalier arlequin)
 Greater yellowlegs, Tringa melanoleuca (chevalier criard) (A)
 Common greenshank, Tringa nebularia (chevalier aboyeur)
 Willet, Tringa semipalmata (chevalier semipalmé) (A)
 Lesser yellowlegs, Tringa flavipes (chevalier à pattes jaunes) (A)
 Marsh sandpiper, Tringa stagnatilis (chevalier stagnatile) 
 Wood sandpiper, Tringa glareola (chevalier sylvain)
 Common redshank, Tringa totanus (chevalier gambette)

Pratincoles and coursers
Order: CharadriiformesFamily: Glareolidae

Glareolidae is a family of wading birds comprising the pratincoles, which have short legs, long pointed wings, and long forked tails, and the coursers, which have long legs, short wings, and long, pointed bills which curve downwards.

 Cream-colored courser, Cursorius cursor (courvite isabelle) (A)
 Collared pratincole, Glareola pratincola (glaréole à collier)
 Oriental pratincole, Glareola maldivarum (glaréole orientale) (A)
 Black-winged pratincole, Glareola nordmanni (glaréole à ailes noires)

Skuas and jaegers
Order: CharadriiformesFamily: Stercorariidae

The family Stercorariidae are, in general, medium to large sea birds, typically with gray or brown plumage, often with white markings on the wings. They nest on the ground in temperate and arctic regions and are long-distance migrants.

 Great skua, Stercorarius skua (grand labbe)
 Pomarine jaeger, Stercorarius pomarinus (labbe pomarin)
 Parasitic jaeger, Stercorarius parasiticus (labbe parasite)
 Long-tailed jaeger, Stercorarius longicaudus (labbe à longue queue)

Auks, murres, and puffins
Order: CharadriiformesFamily: Alcidae

Alcidae are a family of seabirds which are superficially similar to penguins with their black-and-white colors, their upright posture, and some of their habits, but which are able to fly.

 Dovekie, Alle alle (mergule nain)
 Common murre, Uria aalge (guillemot de Troil)
 Thick-billed murre, Uria lomvia (guillemot de Brünnich) (A)
 Razorbill, Alca torda (petit pingouin)
 Great auk, Pinguinus impennis (A) (Extinct)
 Black guillemot, Cepphus grylle (guillemot à miroir) (A)
 Atlantic puffin, Fratercula arctica (macareux moine)

Gulls, terns, and skimmers
Order: CharadriiformesFamily: Laridae

Laridae is a family of medium to large seabirds and includes gulls, terns, and skimmers. Gulls are typically gray or white, often with black markings on the head or wings. They have stout, longish, bills and webbed feet. Terns are a group of generally medium to large seabirds typically with gray or white plumage, often with black markings on the head. Most terns hunt fish by diving but some pick insects off the surface of fresh water. Terns are generally long-lived birds, with several species known to live in excess of 30 years.

 Black-legged kittiwake, Rissa tridactyla (mouette tridactyle)
 Ivory gull, Pagophila eburnea (mouette blanche) (A)
 Sabine's gull, Xema sabini (mouette de Sabine)
 Slender-billed gull, Chroicocephalus genei (goéland railleur)
 Bonaparte's gull, Chroicocephalus philadelphia (mouette de Bonaparte) (A)
 Black-headed gull, Chroicocephalus ridibundus (mouette rieuse)
 Little gull, Hydrocoloeus minutus (mouette pygmée)
 Ross's gull, Rhodostethia rosea (mouette de Ross) (A)
 Laughing gull, Leucophaeus atricilla (mouette atricille) (A)
 Franklin's gull, Leucophaeus pipixcan (mouette de Franklin) (A)
 Mediterranean gull, Ichthyaetus melanocephalus (mouette mélanocéphale)
 Pallas's gull, Ichthyaetus ichthyaetus (goéland ichthyaète) (A)
 Audouin's gull, Ichthyaetus audouinii (goéland d'Audouin)
 Common gull, Larus canus (goéland cendré)
 Ring-billed gull, Larus delawarensis (goéland à bec cerclé)
 European herring gull, Larus argentatus (goéland argenté)
 American herring gull, Larus smithsonianus (goéland d'Amérique) (A)
 Vega gull, Larus vegae (goéland de la Véga)
 Yellow-legged gull, Larus michahellis (goéland leucophée)
 Caspian gull, Larus cachinnans (goéland pontique)
 Iceland gull, Larus glaucoides (goéland arctique)
 Lesser black-backed gull, Larus fuscus (goéland brun)
 Glaucous gull, Larus hyperboreus (goéland bourgmestre)
 Great black-backed gull, Larus marinus (goéland marin)
 Kelp gull, Larus dominicanus (goéland dominicain) (A)
 Sooty tern, Onychoprion fuscatus (sterne fuligineuse) (A)
 Bridled tern, Onychoprion anaethetus (sterne bridée) (A)
 Little tern, Sternula albifrons (sterne naine)
 Gull-billed tern, Gelochelidon nilotica (sterne hansel)
 Caspian tern, Hydroprogne caspia (sterne caspienne)
 Black tern, Chlidonias niger (guifette noire)
 White-winged tern, Chlidonias leucopterus (guifette leucoptère)
 Whiskered tern, Chlidonias hybrida (guifette moustac)
 Roseate tern, Sterna dougallii (sterne de Dougall)
 Common tern, Sterna hirundo (sterne pierregarin)
 Arctic tern, Sterna paradisaea (sterne arctique)
 Forster's tern, Sterna forsteri (sterne de Forster) (A)
 Royal tern, Thalasseus maximus (sterne royale) (A)
 Sandwich tern, Thalasseus sandvicensis (sterne caugek)
 Elegant tern, Thalasseus elegans (sterne élégante) (A)
 Lesser crested tern, Thalasseus bengalensis (sterne voyageuse) (A)
 West African crested tern, Thalasseus albididorsalis (A)

Loons
Order: GaviiformesFamily: Gaviidae

Loons are a group of aquatic birds found in many parts of North America and Northern Europe. They are the size of a large duck or small goose, which they somewhat resemble in shape when swimming, but to which they are completely unrelated. In particular, loons' legs are set very far back which assists swimming underwater but makes walking on land extremely difficult.

 Red-throated loon, Gavia stellata (plongeon catmarin)
 Arctic loon, Gavia arctica (plongeon artique)
 Common loon, Gavia immer (plongeon imbrin)
 Yellow-billed loon, Gavia adamsii (plongeon à bec blanc) (A)

Albatrosses
Order: ProcellariiformesFamily: Diomedeidae

The albatrosses are among the largest of flying birds, and the great albatrosses of the genus Diomedea have the largest wingspans of any extant birds.

 Yellow-nosed albatross, Thalassarche chlororhynchos (albatros à nez jaune) (A)
 Black-browed albatross, Thalassarche melanophris (albatros à sourcils noirs) (A)
 Wandering albatross, Diomedea exulans (albatros hurleur) (A)

Southern storm-petrels
Order: ProcellariiformesFamily: Oceanitidae

The families Oceanitidae and Hydrobatidae are the storm-petrels, small pelagic petrels with a fluttering flight which often follow ships.

 Wilson's storm-petrel, Oceanites oceanicus (océanite de Wilson) (A)

Northern storm-petrels
Order: ProcellariiformesFamily: Hydrobatidae

The northern storm-petrels are relatives of the petrels and are the smallest seabirds. They feed on planktonic crustaceans and small fish picked from the surface, typically while hovering. The flight is fluttering and sometimes bat-like.

 European storm-petrel, Hydrobates pelagicus (océanite tempête)
 Leach's storm-petrel, Hydrobates leucorheus (océanite cul-blanc)
 Swinhoe's storm-petrel, Hydrobates monorhis (océanite de Swinhoe) (A)
 Band-rumped storm-petrel, Hydrobates castro (océanite de Castro) (A)

Shearwaters and petrels
Order: ProcellariiformesFamily: Procellariidae

The procellariids are the main group of medium-sized "true petrels", characterized by united nostrils with medium septum and a long outer functional primary.

 Northern fulmar, Fulmarus glacialis (fulmar boréal)
 Fea's petrel, Pterodroma feae (pétrel gongon) (A)
 Bulwer's petrel, Bulweria bulwerii (pétrel de Bulwer) (A)
 Scopoli's shearwater, Calonectis diomedea (puffin de Scopoli)
 Cory's shearwater, Calonectis borealis (puffin cendré)
 Great shearwater, Ardenna gravis (puffin majeur)
 Sooty shearwater, Ardenna griseus (puffin fuligineux) (A)
 Short-tailed shearwater, Ardenna tenuirostris (puffin à bec grêle) (A)
 Manx shearwater, Puffinus puffinus (puffin des Anglais)
 Yelkouan shearwater, Puffinus yelkouan (puffin yelkouan)
 Balearic shearwater, Puffinus mauretanicus (puffin des Baléares)
 Barolo shearwater, Puffinus baroli (puffin de Macaronésie) (A)

Storks
Order: CiconiiformesFamily: Ciconiidae

Storks are large, long-legged, long-necked wading birds with long, stout bills. Storks are mute, but bill-clattering is an important mode of communication at the nest. Their nests can be large and may be reused for many years. Many species are migratory.

 Black stork, Ciconia nigra (cigogne noire)
 White stork, Ciconia ciconia (cigogne blanche)

Frigatebirds
Order: SuliformesFamily: Fregatidae

Frigatebirds are large seabirds from the tropics with a very high aspect ratio. These birds do not swim and cannot walk well, and cannot take off from a flat surface.

 Magnificent frigatebird, Fregata magnificens (frégate superbe) (A)

Boobies and gannets
Order: SuliformesFamily: Sulidae

The sulids comprise the gannets and boobies. Both groups are medium to large coastal seabirds that plunge-dive for fish.

 Masked booby, Sula dactylatra (fou masqué) (A)
 Brown booby, Sula leucogaster (fou brun) (A)
 Red-footed booby, Sula sula (fou à pieds rouges) (A)
 Northern gannet, Morus bassanus (fou de Bassan)

Cormorants and shags
Order: SuliformesFamily: Phalacrocoracidae

Phalacrocoracidae is a family of medium-to-large fish-eating seabirds that includes cormorants and shags. Plumage coloration varies, with the majority having mainly dark plumage.

 Pygmy cormorant, Microcarbo pygmeus (cormoran pygmée) (A)
 Great cormorant, Phalacrocorax carbo (grand Cormoran)
 European shag, Gulosus aristotelis (cormoran huppé)
 Double-crested cormorant, Nannopterum auritum (cormoran à aigrettes) (A)

Pelicans
Order: PelecaniformesFamily: Pelecanidae

Pelicans are very large water birds with a distinctive pouch under their beak. They have four webbed toes.

 Great white pelican, Pelecanus onocrotalus (pélican blanc) (A)
 Dalmatian pelican, Pelecanus crispus (A)

Herons, egrets, and bitterns
Order: PelecaniformesFamily: Ardeidae

The family Ardeidae contains bitterns, herons, and egrets. Herons and egrets are medium to large wading birds with long necks and legs. Bitterns tend to be shorter necked and more wary. Members of Ardeidae fly with their necks retracted, unlike other long-necked birds such as storks, ibises, and spoonbills.

 Great bittern, Botaurus stellaris (butor étoilé)
 Little bittern, Ixobrychus minutus (blongios nain)
 Great blue heron, Ardea herodias (grand Héron) (A)
 Gray heron, Ardea cinerea (héron cendré)
 Black-headed heron, Ardea melanocephala (héron mélanocéphale) (A)
 Purple heron, Ardea purpurea (héron pourpré)
 Great egret, Ardea alba (grande aigrette)
 Intermediate egret, Ardea intermedia (héron intermédiaire) (A)
 Little egret, Egretta garzetta (aigrette garzette)
 Western reef-heron, Egretta gularis (aigrette des récifs) (A)
 Cattle egret, Bubulcus ibis (héron garde-boeufs)
 Squacco heron, Ardeola ralloides (héron crabier)
 Green heron, Butorides virescens (héron vert) (A)
 Striated heron, Butorides striata (héron strié) (A)
 Black-crowned night-heron, Nycticorax nycticorax (bihoreau gris)

Ibises and spoonbills
Order: PelecaniformesFamily: Threskiornithidae

Threskiornithidae is a family of large terrestrial and wading birds which includes the ibises and spoonbills. They have long, broad wings with 11 primary and about 20 secondary feathers. They are strong fliers and, despite their size and weight, very capable soarers.

 Glossy ibis, Plegadis falcinellus (ibis falcinelle)
 African sacred ibis, Threskiornis aethiopicus (ibis sacré) (I)
 Northern bald ibis, Geronticus eremita (ibis chauve) (I)
 Eurasian spoonbill, Platalea leucorodia (spatule blanche)

Osprey
Order: AccipitriformesFamily: Pandionidae

The western osprey is a medium-large raptor which is a specialist fish-eater.

 Western osprey, Pandion haliaetus (balbuzard pêcheur)

Hawks, eagles, and kites
Order: AccipitriformesFamily: Accipitridae

Accipitridae is a family of birds of prey which includes hawks, eagles, kites, harriers, and Old World vultures. They have powerful hooked beaks for tearing flesh from their prey, strong legs, powerful talons, and keen eyesight.

 Black-winged kite, Elanus caeruleus (elanion blanc) 
 Bearded vulture, Gypaetus barbatus (gypaète barbu)
 Egyptian vulture, Neophron percnopterus (percnoptère d'Egypte)
 European honey-buzzard, Pernis apivorus (bondrée apivore)
 Cinereous vulture, Aegypius monachus (vautour moine)
 Lappet-faced vulture, Torgos tracheliotos (vautour oricou) (A)
 Rüppell's griffon, Gyps rueppelli (vautour de Rüppell) (A)
 Eurasian griffon, Gyps fulvus (vautour fauve)
 Short-toed snake-eagle, Circaetus gallicus (circaète Jean-le-Blanc)
 Lesser spotted eagle, Clanga pomarina (aigle pomarin) (A)
 Greater spotted eagle, Clanga clanga (aigle criard) (A)
 Booted eagle, Aquila pennatus (aigle botté)
 Steppe eagle, Aquila nipalensis (aigle des steppes) (A)
 Spanish imperial eagle, Aquila adalberti (aigle ibérique) (A)
 Eastern imperial eagle, Aquila heliaca (aigle impérial) (A)
 Golden eagle, Aquila chrysaetos (aigle royal)
 Bonelli's eagle, Aquila fasciata (aigle de Bonelli)
 Eurasian marsh-harrier, Circus aeruginosus (busard des roseaux)
 Hen harrier, Circus cyaneus (busard Saint-Martin)
 Northern harrier, Circus hudsonius (A)
 Pallid harrier, Circus macrourus (busard pâle) (A)
 Montagu's harrier, Circus pygargus (busard cendré)
 Eurasian sparrowhawk, Accipiter nisus (epervier d'Europe)
 Northern goshawk, Accipiter gentilis (autour des palombes)
 Red kite, Milvus milvus (milan royal)
 Black kite, Milvus migrans (milan noir)
 White-tailed eagle, Haliaeetus albicilla (pygargue à queue blanche)
 Rough-legged hawk, Buteo lagopus (buse pattue) (A)
 Common buzzard, Buteo buteo (buse variable)
 Long-legged buzzard, Buteo rufinus (buse féroce(A)

Barn-owls
Order: StrigiformesFamily: Tytonidae

Barn-owls are medium to large owls with large heads and characteristic heart-shaped faces. They have long strong legs with powerful talons.

 Western barn owl, Tyto alba (chouette effraie)

Owls
Order: StrigiformesFamily: Strigidae

Typical owls are small to large solitary nocturnal birds of prey. They have large forward-facing eyes and ears, a hawk-like beak, and a conspicuous circle of feathers around each eye called a facial disc.

 Eurasian scops-owl, Otus scops (petit-duc scops)
 Eurasian eagle-owl, Bubo bubo (hibou grand-duc)
 Snowy owl, Bubo scandiacus (harfang des neiges) (A)
 Northern hawk owl, Surnia ulula (chouette épervière) (A)
 Eurasian pygmy-owl, Glaucidium passerinum (chevêchette d'Europe)
 Little owl, Athene noctua (chevêche d'Athéna)
 Tawny owl, Strix aluco (chouette hulotte)
 Long-eared owl, Asio otus (hibou moyen-duc)
 Short-eared owl, Asio flammeus (hibou des marais)
 Boreal owl, Aegolius funereus (nyctale de Tengmalm)

Hoopoes
Order: BucerotiformesFamily: Upupidae

Hoopoes have black, white, and orangey-pink coloring with a large erectile crest on their head.

 Eurasian hoopoe, Upupa epops (huppe fasciée)

Kingfishers
Order: CoraciiformesFamily: Alcedinidae

Kingfishers are medium-sized birds with large heads, long pointed bills, short legs, and stubby tails.

 Common kingfisher, Alcedo atthis (martin-pêcheur d'Europe)

Bee-eaters
Order: CoraciiformesFamily: Meropidae

The bee-eaters are a group of near-passerine birds. Most species are found in Africa but others occur in southern Europe, Madagascar, Australia, and New Guinea. They are characterized by richly colored plumage, slender bodies, and usually elongated central tail feathers. All are colorful and have long downturned bills and pointed wings, which give them a swallow-like appearance when seen from afar.

 Blue-cheeked bee-eater, Merops persicus (guêpier de Perse) (A)
 European bee-eater, Merops apiaster (guêpier d'Europe)

Rollers
Order: CoraciiformesFamily: Coraciidae

Rollers resemble crows in size and build, but are more closely related to the kingfishers and bee-eaters. They share the colorful appearance of those groups with blues and browns predominating. The two inner front toes are connected, but the outer toe is not.

 European roller, Coracias garrulus (rollier d'Europe)

Woodpeckers
Order: PiciformesFamily: Picidae

Woodpeckers are small to medium-sized birds with chisel-like beaks, short legs, stiff tails, and long tongues used for capturing insects. Some species have feet with two toes pointing forward and two backward, while several species have only three toes. Many woodpeckers have the habit of tapping noisily on tree trunks with their beaks.

 Eurasian wryneck, Jynx torquilla (torcol fourmilier)
 Eurasian three-toed woodpecker, Picoides tridactylus (pic tridactyle)
 Middle spotted woodpecker, Dendrocoptes medius (pic mar)
 White-backed woodpecker, Dendrocopos leucotos (pic à dos blanc)
 Great spotted woodpecker, Dendrocopos major (pic épeiche)
 Lesser spotted woodpecker, Dryobates minor (pic épeichette)
 Gray-headed woodpecker, Picus canus (pic cendré)
 Eurasian green woodpecker, Picus viridis (pic vert)
 Iberian green woodpecker, Picus sharpei
 Black woodpecker, Dryocopus martius (pic noir)

Falcons and caracaras
Order: FalconiformesFamily: Falconidae

Falconidae is a family of diurnal birds of prey. They differ from hawks, eagles, and kites in that they kill with their beaks instead of their talons.

 Lesser kestrel, Falco naumanni (faucon crécerellette)
 Eurasian kestrel, Falco tinnunculus (faucon crécerelle)
 Red-footed falcon, Falco vespertinus (faucon kobez)
 Amur falcon, Falco amurensis (faucon de l'Amour) (A)
 Eleonora's falcon, Falco eleonorae (faucon d'Eléonore)
 Sooty falcon, Falco concolor (faucon concolore) (A)
 Merlin, Falco columbarius (faucon émerillon)
 Eurasian hobby, Falco subbuteo (faucon hobereau)
 Lanner falcon, Falco biarmicus (faucon lanier) (A)
 Saker falcon, Falco cherrug (faucon sacre)
 Gyrfalcon, Falco rusticolus (faucon gerfaut) (A)
 Peregrine falcon, Falco peregrinus (faucon pèlerin)

Old World parrots
Order: PsittaciformesFamily: Psittaculidae

Characteristic features of parrots include a strong curved bill, an upright stance, strong legs, and clawed zygodactyl feet. Many parrots are vividly colored, and some are multi-colored. Old World parrots are found from Africa east across south and southeast Asia and Oceania to Australia and New Zealand.

 Rose-ringed parakeet, Psittacula krameri (perruche à collier) (I)

Vireos, shrike-babblers, and erpornis
Order: PasseriformesFamily: Vireonidae

The vireos are a group of small- to medium-sized passerine birds restricted to the New World.

 Red-eyed vireo, Vireo olivaceus (viréo aux yeux rouges) (A)

Old World orioles
Order: PasseriformesFamily: Oriolidae

The Old World orioles are colorful passerine birds that are not related to the New World orioles.

 Eurasian golden oriole, Oriolus oriolus (loriot d'Europe)

Shrikes
Order: PasseriformesFamily: Laniidae

Shrikes are passerine birds known for their habit of catching other birds and small animals and impaling the uneaten portions of their bodies on thorns. A shrike's beak is hooked, like that of a typical bird of prey.

 Red-backed shrike, Lanius collurio (pie-grièche écorcheur)
 Red-tailed shrike, Lanius phoenicuroides (pie-grièche du Turkestan) (A)
 Isabelline shrike, Lanius isabellinus (pie-grièche isabelle) (A)
 Brown shrike, Lanius cristatus (pie-grièche brune) (A)
 Iberian gray shrike, Lanius meridionalis (pie-grièche méridionale)
 Great gray shrike, Lanius excubitor (pie-grièche grise)
 Lesser gray shrike, Lanius minor (pie-grièche à poitrine rose) (Ex)
 Masked shrike, Lanius nubicus (pie-grièche masquée) (A)
 Woodchat shrike, Lanius senator (pie-grièche à tête rousse)

Crows, jays, and magpies
Order: PasseriformesFamily: Corvidae

The family Corvidae includes crows, ravens, jays, choughs, magpies, treepies, nutcrackers, and ground jays. Corvids are larger than the average size for species in the order Passeriformes and some show high levels of intelligence.

 Eurasian jay, Garrulus glandarius (geai des chênes)
 Eurasian magpie, Pica pica (pie bavarde)
 Eurasian nutcracker, Nucifraga caryocatactes (cassenoix moucheté)
 Red-billed Chough, Pyrrhocorax pyrrhocorax  (crave à bec rouge)
 Yellow-billed chough, Pyrrhocorax graculus (chocard à bec jaune)
 Eurasian jackdaw, Corvus monedula (choucas des tours)
 Daurian jackdaw, Coloeus dauuricus (choucas de Daourie) (A)
 Rook, Corvus frugilegus (corbeau freux)
 Carrion crow, Corvus corone (corneille noire)
 Hooded crow, Corvus cornix (corneille mantelée)
 Fan-tailed raven, Corvus rhipidurus (corbeau à queue courte) (A)
 Common raven, Corvus corax (grand corbeau)

Tits, chickadees, and titmice
Order: PasseriformesFamily: Paridae

The Paridae are mainly small stocky woodland species with short stout bills. Some have crests. They are adaptable birds, with a mixed diet including seeds and insects.

 Coal tit, Periparus ater (mésange noire)
 Crested tit, Lophophanes cristatus (mésange huppée)
 Marsh tit, Poecile palustris (mésange nonnette)
 Willow tit, Poecile montanus (mésange boréale)
 Eurasian blue tit, Cyanistes caeruleus (mésange bleue)
 Azure tit, Cyanistes cyanus (mésange azurée) (A)
 Great tit, Parus major (mésange charbonnière)

Penduline-tits
Order: PasseriformesFamily: Remizidae

The penduline-tits are a group of small insectivorous birds related to the true tits.

 Eurasian penduline-tit, Remiz pendulinus (rémiz penduline)

Larks
Order: PasseriformesFamily: Alaudidae

Larks are small terrestrial birds with often extravagant songs and display flights. Most larks are dull in appearance. Their food is insects and seeds.

 Bar-tailed lark, Ammomanes cinctura (ammomane élégante) (A)
 Horned lark, Eremophila alpestris (alouette hausse-col)
 Greater short-toed lark, Calandrella brachydactyla (alouette calandrelle)
 Bimaculated lark, Melanocorypha bimaculata (alouette monticole) (A)
 Calandra lark, Melanocorypha calandra (alouette calandre)
 Dupont's lark, Chersophilus duponti (sirli ricoti) (A)
 Wood lark, Lullula arborea (alouette lulu)
 Mediterranean short-toed lark, Alaudala rufescens (alouette pispolette)
 Eurasian skylark, Alauda arvensis (alouette des champs)
 Thekla's lark, Galerida theklae (cochevis de Thékla)
 Crested lark, Galerida cristata (cochevis huppé)

Bearded reedling
Order: PasseriformesFamily: Panuridae

This species, the only one in its family, is found in reed beds throughout temperate Europe and Asia.

 Bearded reedling, Panurus biarmicus (panure à moustaches)

Cisticolas and allies
Order: PasseriformesFamily: Cisticolidae

The Cisticolidae are warblers found mainly in warmer southern regions of the Old World. They are generally very small birds of drab brown or gray appearance found in open country such as grassland or scrub.

 Zitting cisticola, Cisticola juncidis (cisticole des joncs)

Reed warblers and allies
Order: PasseriformesFamily: Acrocephalidae

The members of this family are usually rather large for "warblers". Most are rather plain olivaceous brown above with much yellow to beige below. They are usually found in open woodland, reedbeds, or tall grass. The family occurs mostly in southern to western Eurasia and surroundings, but it also ranges far into the Pacific, with some species in Africa.

 Booted warbler, Iduna caligata (hypolaïs bottée) (A)
 Sykes's warbler, Iduna rama (hypolaïs rama)
 Eastern olivaceous warbler, Iduna pallida (hypolaïs pâle) (A)
 Western olivaceous warbler, Iduna opaca (hypolaïs obscure)
 Melodious warbler, Hippolais polyglotta (hypolaïs polyglotte)
 Icterine warbler, Hippolais icterina (hypolaïs ictérine)
 Aquatic warbler, Acrocephalus paludicola (phragmite aquatique)
 Moustached warbler, Acrocephalus melanopogon (lusciniole à moustaches)
 Sedge warbler, Acrocephalus schoenobaenus (phragmite des joncs)
 Paddyfield warbler, Acrocephalus agricola (rousserolle isabelle) (A)
 Blyth's reed warbler, Acrocephalus dumetorum (rousserolle des buissons) (A)
 Marsh warbler, Acrocephalus palustris (rousserolle verderolle)
 Common reed warbler, Acrocephalus scirpaceus (rousserolle effarvatte)
 Great reed warbler, Acrocephalus arundinaceus (rousserolle turdoïde)

Grassbirds and allies
Order: PasseriformesFamily: Locustellidae

Locustellidae are a family of small insectivorous songbirds found mainly in Eurasia, Africa, and the Australian region. They are smallish birds with tails that are usually long and pointed, and tend to be drab brownish or buffy all over.

 Gray's grasshopper warbler, Helopsaltes fasciolatus (locustelle fasciée) (A)
 Pallas's grasshopper warbler, Helopsaltes certhiola (locustelle de Pallas) (A)
 Lanceolated warbler, Locustella lanceolata (locustelle lancéolée) (A)
 River warbler, Locustella fluviatilis (locustelle fluviatile) (A)
 Savi's warbler, Locustella luscinioides (locustelle luscinioide)
 Common grasshopper-warbler, Locustella naevia (locustelle tachetée)

Swallows
Order: PasseriformesFamily: Hirundinidae

The family Hirundinidae is adapted to aerial feeding. They have a slender streamlined body, long pointed wings, and a short bill with a wide gape. The feet are adapted to perching rather than walking, and the front toes are partially joined at the base.

 Plain martin, Riparia paludicola (hirondelle paludicole) (A)
 Bank swallow, Riparia riparia (hirondelle de rivage)
 Eurasian crag-martin, Ptyonoprogne rupestris (hirondelle de rochers)
 Barn swallow, Hirundo rustica (hirondelle rustique)
 Red-rumped swallow, Hirundo daurica (hirondelle rousseline)
 Cliff swallow, Petrochelidon pyrrhonota - hirondelle à front blanc) (A)
 Common house-martin, Delichon urbicum (hirondelle de fenêtre)

Leaf warblers
Order: PasseriformesFamily: Phylloscopidae

Leaf warblers are a family of small insectivorous birds found mostly in Eurasia and ranging into Wallacea and Africa. The species are of various sizes, often green-plumaged above and yellow below, or more subdued with grayish-green to grayish-brown colors.

 Wood warbler, Phylloscopus sibilatrix (pouillot siffleur)
 Western Bonelli's warbler, Phylloscopus bonelli (pouillot de Bonelli)
 Eastern Bonelli's warbler, Phylloscopus orientalis (pouillot oriental) (A)
 Yellow-browed warbler, Phylloscopus inornatus (pouillot à grands sourcils)
 Hume's warbler, Phylloscopus humei (pouillot de Hume) (A)
 Pallas's leaf warbler, Phylloscopus proregulus (pouillot de Pallas) (A)
 Radde's warbler, Phylloscopus schwarzi (pouillot de Schwarz) (A)
 Dusky warbler, Phylloscopus fuscatus (pouillot brun) (A)
 Willow warbler, Phylloscopus trochilus (pouillot fitis)
 Common chiffchaff, Phylloscopus collybita (pouillot véloce)
 Iberian chiffchaff, Phylloscopus brehmii (pouillot ibérique)
 Eastern crowned warbler, Phylloscopus coronatus (pouillot de Temminck) (A)
 Greenish warbler, Phylloscopus trochiloides (pouillot verdâtre) (A)
 Two-barred warbler, Phylloscopus plumbeitarsus (pouillot à deux barres) (A)
 Arctic warbler, Phylloscopus borealis (pouillot boréal) (A)

Bush warblers and allies
Order: PasseriformesFamily: Scotocercidae

The members of this family are found throughout Africa, Asia, and Polynesia. Their taxonomy is in flux, and some authorities place some genera in other families.

 Cetti's warbler, Cettia cetti (bouscarle de Cetti)

Long-tailed tits
Order: PasseriformesFamily: Aegithalidae

Long-tailed tits are a group of small passerine birds with medium to long tails. They make woven bag nests in trees. Most eat a mixed diet which includes insects.

 Long-tailed tit, Aegithalos caudatus  (mésange à longue queue)

Sylviid warblers, parrotbills, and allies
Order: PasseriformesFamily: Sylviidae

The family Sylviidae is a group of small insectivorous birds. They mainly occur as breeding species, as another common name (Old World warblers) implies, in Europe, Asia and, to a lesser extent, Africa. Most are of generally undistinguished appearance, but many have distinctive songs.

 Eurasian blackcap, Sylvia atricapilla (fauvette à tête noire)
 Garden warbler, Sylvia borin (fauvette des jardins)
 Barred warbler, Curruca nisoria (fauvette épervière) (A)
 Lesser whitethroat, Curruca curruca (fauvette babillarde)
 Western Orphean warbler, Curruca hortensis (fauvette orphée)
 Asian desert warbler, Curruca nana (fauvette naine) (A)
 Tristram's warbler, Curruca deserticola (fauvette de l'Atlas) (A)
 Rüppell's warbler, Curruca ruppeli (fauvette de Rüppell) (A)
 Sardinian warbler, Curruca melanocephala (fauvette mélanocéphale)
 Moltoni's warbler, Curruca subalpina (fauvette de Moltoni)
 Western subalpine warbler, Curruca iberiae
 Greater whitethroat, Curruca communis (fauvette grisette)
 Spectacled warbler, Curruca conspicillata (fauvette à lunettes)
 Marmora's warbler Curruca sarda (fauvette sarde)
 Dartford warbler, Curruca undata (fauvette pitchou)

Laughingthrushes and allies
Order: PasseriformesFamily: Leiothrichidae

The members of this family are diverse in size and coloration, though those of genus Turdoides tend to be brown or grayish. The family is found in Africa, India, and southeast Asia.

 Red-billed leiothrix Leiothrix lutea (léiothrix jaune) (I)

Kinglets
Order: PasseriformesFamily: Regulidae

The kinglets and "crests" are a small family of birds which resemble some warblers. They are very small insectivorous birds in the single genus Regulus. The adults have colored crowns, giving rise to their name.

 Goldcrest, Regulus regulus (roitelet huppé)
 Common firecrest, Regulus ignicapillus (roitelet à triple bandeau)

Wallcreeper
Order: PasseriformesFamily: Tichodromidae

The wallcreeper is a small bird related to the nuthatch family, which has stunning crimson, gray, and black plumage. It is the only species in its family.

 Wallcreeper, Tichodroma muraria (tichodrome échelette)

Nuthatches
Order: PasseriformesFamily: Sittidae

Nuthatches are small woodland birds. They have the unusual ability to climb down trees head first, unlike other birds which can only go upwards. Nuthatches have big heads, short tails, and powerful bills and feet. The Corsican nuthatch is France's sole endemic species.

 Eurasian nuthatch, Sitta europaea (sittelle torchepot)
 Corsican nuthatch, Sitta whiteheadi (sittelle corse) (endemic)

Treecreepers
Order: PasseriformesFamily: Certhiidae

Treecreepers are small woodland birds, brown above and white below. They have thin pointed down-curved bills, which they use to extricate insects from bark. They have stiff tail feathers, like woodpeckers, which they use to support themselves on vertical trees.

 Eurasian treecreeper, Certhia familiaris (grimpereau des bois)
 Short-toed treecreeper, Certhia brachydactyla (grimpereau des jardins)

Wrens
Order: PasseriformesFamily: Troglodytidae

The wrens are mainly small and inconspicuous except for their loud songs. These birds have short wings and thin down-turned bills. Several species often hold their tails upright. All are insectivorous.

 Eurasian wren, Troglodytes troglodytes (troglodyte mignon)

Dippers
Order: PasseriformesFamily: Cinclidae

Dippers are a group of perching birds whose habitat includes aquatic environments in the Americas, Europe, and Asia. They are named for their bobbing or dipping movements.

 White-throated dipper, Cinclus cinclus (cincle plongeur)

Starlings
Order: PasseriformesFamily: Sturnidae

Starlings are small to medium-sized passerine birds. Their flight is strong and direct and they are very gregarious. Their preferred habitat is fairly open country. They eat insects and fruit. Their plumage is typically dark with a metallic sheen.

 European starling, Sturnus vulgaris (étourneau sansonnet)
 Spotless starling, Sturnus unicolor (étourneau unicolore)
 Rosy starling, Pastor roseus (étourneau roselin) (A)

Thrushes and allies
Order: PasseriformesFamily: Turdidae

The thrushes are a family of birds that occur mainly in the Old World. They are plump, soft-plumaged, small-to-medium-sized insectivores or sometimes omnivores, often feeding on the ground. Many have attractive songs.

 White's thrush, Zoothera aurea (grive dorée) (A)
 Scaly thrush, Zoothera dauma (grive dama) (A)
 Veery, Catharus fuscescens (grive fauve) (A)
 Gray-cheeked thrush, Catharus minimus (grive à joues grises) (A)
 Swainson's thrush, Catharus ustulatus  (grive à dos olive) (A)
 Siberian thrush, Geokichla sibirica (grive de Sibérie) (A)
 Mistle thrush, Turdus viscivorus (grive draine)
 Song thrush, Turdus philomelos (grive musicienne)
 Redwing, Turdus iliacus (grive mauvis)
 Eurasian blackbird, Turdus merula (merle noir)
 Eyebrowed thrush, Turdus obscurus (merle obscure) (A)
 Fieldfare, Turdus pilaris (grive litorne)
 Ring ouzel, Turdus torquatus (merle à plastron)
 Black-throated thrush, Turdus atrogularis (grive à gorge noire) (A)
 Red-throated thrush, Turdus ruficollis (grive à gorge rousse) (A)
 Dusky thrush, Turdus eunomus (grive à ailes rousses) (A)
 Naumann's thrush, Turdus naumanni (grive de Naumann) (A)

Old World flycatchers
Order: PasseriformesFamily: Muscicapidae

Old World flycatchers are a large group of birds which are mainly small arboreal insectivores. The appearance of these birds is highly varied, but they mostly have weak songs and harsh calls.

 Spotted flycatcher, Muscicapa striata (gobemouche gris)
 Rufous-tailed scrub-robin, Cercotrichas galactotes (agrobate roux) (A)
 European robin, Erithacus rubecula (rougegorge familier)
 White-throated robin, Irania gutturalis (iranie à gorge blanche) (A)
 Thrush nightingale, Luscinia luscinia (rossignol progné) (A)
 Common nightingale, Luscinia megarhynchos (rossignol philomèle)
 Bluethroat, Luscinia svecica (gorgebleue à miroir)
 Red-flanked bluetail, Tarsiger cyanurus (rossignol à flancs roux) (A)
 Taiga flycatcher, Ficedula albicilla (gobemouche de la taïga) (A)
 Red-breasted flycatcher, Ficedula parva (gobemouche nain)
 Semicollared flycatcher, Ficedula semitorquata (gobemouche à demi-collier) (A)
 European pied flycatcher Ficedula hypoleuca (gobemouche noir)
 Collared flycatcher, Ficedula albicollis (gobemouche à collier)
 Moussier's redstart, Phoenicurus moussieri (rougequeue de Moussier) (A)
 Common redstart, Phoenicurus phoenicurus (rougequeue à front blanc)
 Black redstart, Phoenicurus ochruros (rougequeue noir)
 Rufous-tailed rock-thrush, Monticola saxatilis (monticole merle-de-roche)
 Blue rock-thrush, Monticola solitarius (monticole merle-bleu)
 Whinchat, Saxicola rubetra (tarier des prés)
 European stonechat, Saxicola rubicola (tarier pâtre)
 Siberian stonechat, Saxicola maurus (tarier de Sibérie) (A)
 Northern wheatear, Oenanthe oenanthe (traquet motteux)
 Isabelline wheatear, Oenanthe isabellina (traquet isabelle) (A)
 Desert wheatear, Oenanthe deserti (traquet du désert) (A)
 Western black-eared wheatear, Oenanthe hispanica 
 Eastern black-eared wheatear, Oenanthe melanoleuca (A)
 Pied wheatear, Oenanthe pleschanka (traquet pie) (A)
 Black wheatear, Oenanthe leucura (traquet rieur)
 White-crowned wheatear, Oenanthe leucopyga (traquet à tête blanche) (A)
 Kurdish wheatear, Oenanthe xanthoprymna (traquet kurde) (A)

Waxwings
Order: PasseriformesFamily: Bombycillidae

The waxwings are a group of birds with soft silky plumage and unique red tips to some of the wing feathers. In the Bohemian and cedar waxwings, these tips look like sealing wax and give the group its name. These are arboreal birds of northern forests. They live on insects in summer and berries in winter.

 Bohemian waxwing, Bombycilla garrulus (jaseur boréal)

Waxbills and allies
Order: PasseriformesFamily: Estrildidae

The estrildid finches are small passerine birds of the Old World tropics and Australasia. They are gregarious and often colonial seed eaters with short thick but pointed bills. They are all similar in structure and habits, but have a wide variation in plumage colors and patterns.

 Indian silverbill, Euodice malabarica (capucin bec-de-plomb) (I)

Accentors
Order: PasseriformesFamily: Prunellidae

The accentors are the only bird family which is endemic to the Palearctic. They are small, fairly drab species superficially similar to sparrows.

 Alpine accentor, Prunella collaris (accenteur alpin)
 Black-throated accentor, Prunella atrogularis (accenteur à gorge noire) (A)
 Dunnock, Prunella modularis  (accenteur mouchet)

Old World sparrows
Order: PasseriformesFamily: Passeridae

In general, Old World sparrows tend to be small, plump, brown or gray birds with short tails and short powerful beaks. Sparrows are seed eaters, but they also consume small insects.

 House sparrow, Passer domesticus (moineau domestique)
 Italian sparrow, Passer italiae (moineau cisalpin)
 Spanish sparrow, Passer hispaniolensis (moineau espagnol) (A)
 Eurasian tree sparrow, Passer montanus (moineau friquet)
 Rock sparrow, Petronia petronia (moineau soulcie)
 White-winged snowfinch, Montifringilla nivalis (niverolle alpine)

Wagtails and pipits
Order: PasseriformesFamily: Motacillidae

Motacillidae is a family of small birds with medium to long tails which includes the wagtails, longclaws, and pipits. They are slender ground-feeding insectivores of open country.

 Gray wagtail, Motacilla cinerea (bergeronnette des ruisseaux)
 Western yellow wagtail, Motacilla flava (bergeronnette printanière)
 Eastern yellow wagtail, Motacilla tschutschensis (bergeronnette de Béringie) (A)
 Citrine wagtail, Motacilla citreola (bergeronnette citrine) (A)
 White wagtail, Motacilla alba (bergeronnette grise)
 Richard's pipit, Anthus richardi (pipit de Richard)
 Blyth's pipit, Anthus godlewskii (pipit de Godlewski) (A)
 Tawny pipit, Anthus campestris (pipit rousseline)
 Meadow pipit, Anthus pratensis (pipit farlouse)
 Tree pipit, Anthus trivialis (pipit des arbres)
 Olive-backed pipit, Anthus hodgsoni  (pipit à dos olive) (A)
 Pechora pipit, Anthus gustavi (pipit de la Petchora) (A)
 Red-throated pipit, Anthus cervinus (pipit à gorge rousse)
 Water pipit, Anthus spinoletta (pipit spioncelle)
 Rock pipit, Anthus petrosus (pipit maritime)
 American pipit, Anthus rubescens (pipit farlousane) (A)

Finches, euphonias, and allies
Order: PasseriformesFamily: Fringillidae

Finches are seed-eating birds that are small to moderately large and have a strong beak, usually conical and in some species very large. All have twelve tail feathers and nine primaries. These birds have a bouncing flight with alternating bouts of flapping and gliding on closed wings, and most sing well.

 Common chaffinch, Fringilla coelebs (pinson des arbres)
 Brambling, Fringilla montifringilla (pinson du Nord)
 Hawfinch, Coccothraustes coccothraustes (gros-bec casse-noyaux)
 Common rosefinch, Carpodacus erythrinus (roselin cramoisi)
 Pine grosbeak, Pinicola enucleator (durbec des sapins) (A)
 Eurasian bullfinch, Pyrrhula pyrrhula (bouvreuil pivoine)
 Trumpeter finch, Rhodopechys githaginea (roselin githagine) (A)
 European greenfinch, Chloris chloris (verdier d'Europe)
 Twite, Linaria flavirostris (linotte à bec jaune)
 Eurasian linnet, Linaria cannabina (linotte mélodieuse)
 Common redpoll, Acanthis flammea (sizerin flammé)
 Lesser redpoll, Acanthis cabaret (sizerin cabaret)
 Hoary redpoll, Acanthis hornemanni (sizerin blanchâtre) (A)
 Parrot crossbill, Loxia pytyopsittacus (bec-croisé perroquet) (A)
 Red crossbill, Loxia curvirostra (bec-croisé des sapins)
 White-winged crossbill, Loxia leucoptera (bec-croisé bifascié) (A)
 European goldfinch, Carduelis carduelis (chardonneret élégant)
 Citril finch, Serinus citrinella (venturon montagnard)
 Corsican finch, Serinus corsicana (venturon corse)
 European serin, Serinus serinus (serin cini)
 Eurasian siskin, Spinus spinus (tarin des aulnes)

Longspurs and snow buntings
Order: PasseriformesFamily: Calcariidae

The Calcariidae are a family of birds that had been traditionally grouped with the New World sparrows, but differ in a number of respects and are usually found in open grassy areas.

 Lapland longspur, Calcarius lapponicus (plectrophane lapon)
 Snow bunting, Plectrophenax nivalis (plectrophane des neiges)

Old World buntings
Order: PasseriformesFamily: Emberizidae

Emberizidae is a family of passerine birds containing a single genus. Until 2017, the New World sparrows (Passerellidae) were also considered part of this family.

 Black-headed bunting, Emberiza melanocephala (bruant mélanocéphale) (A)
 Red-headed bunting, Emberiza bruniceps (bruant à tête rousse) (A)
 Corn bunting, Emberiza calandra (bruant proyer)
 Rock bunting, Emberiza cia (bruant fou)
 Cirl bunting Emberiza cirlus (bruant zizi)
 Yellowhammer, Emberiza citrinella (bruant jaune)
 Pine bunting, Emberiza leucocephalos (bruant à calotte blanche) (A)
 Ortolan bunting, Emberiza hortulana (bruant ortolan)
 Cretzschmar's bunting, Emberiza caesia (bruant cendrillard) (A)
 Pallas's bunting, Emberiza pallasi (bruant de Pallas) (A)
 Reed bunting, Emberiza schoeniclus (bruant des roseaux)
 Yellow-breasted bunting, Emberiza aureola (bruant auréole) (A)
 Little bunting, Emberiza pusilla (bruant nain) (A)
 Rustic bunting, Emberiza rustica -  (bruant rustique) (A)
 Black-faced bunting, Emberiza spodocephala (bruant masqué) (A)
 Chestnut bunting, Emberiza rutila (bruant roux) (A)
 Yellow-browed bunting, Emberiza chrysophrys (bruant à sourcils jaunes) (A)

New World sparrows
Order: PasseriformesFamily: Passerellidae

Until 2017, these species were considered part of the family Emberizidae. Most of the species are known as sparrows, but these birds are not closely related to the Old World sparrows which are in the family Passeridae. Many of these have distinctive head patterns.

 White-crowned sparrow, Zonotrichia leucophrys (bruant à couronne blanche) (A)
 White-throated sparrow, Zonotrichia albicollis (bruant à gorge blanche) (A)

Troupials and allies
Order: PasseriformesFamily: Icteridae

The icterids are a group of small to medium-sized, often colorful birds restricted to the New World. Most species have black as a predominant plumage color, often enlivened by yellow, orange, or red.

 Bobolink, Dolichonyx oryzivorus (goglu des prés) (A)
 Brown-headed cowbird, Molothrus ater (vacher à tête brune) (A)

New World warblers
Order: PasseriformesFamily: Parulidae

Parulidae are a group of small, often colorful birds restricted to the New World. Most are arboreal and insectivorous.

 Ovenbird, Seiurus aurocapilla (paruline couronnée) (A)
 Northern waterthrush, Parkesia noveboracensis (paruline des ruisseaux) (A)
 Black-and-white warbler, Mniotilta varia (paruline noir et blanc) (A)
 American redstart, Setophaga ruticilla (paruline flamboyante) (A)
 Northern parula, Setophaga americana (paruline à collier) (A)
 Blackburnian warbler, Setophaga fusca' (paruline à gorge orangée) (A)
 Yellow warbler, Setophaga petechia (paruline jaune) (A)
 Chestnut-sided warbler, Setophaga pensylvanica (paruline à flancs marron) (A)
 Blackpoll warbler, Setophaga striata (paruline rayée) (A)

Cardinals and alliesOrder: PasseriformesFamily''': Cardinalidae

The cardinals are a family of robust seed-eating birds with strong bills. They are typically associated with open woodland. The sexes usually have distinct plumages.

 Scarlet tanager, Piranga olivacea (tangara écarlate) (A)
 Rose-breasted grosbeak, Pheucticus ludovicianus (cardinal à poitrine rose'') (A)

See also
List of birds
Lists of birds by region

References 

Sources

External links 

 Liste des espèces d'oiseaux de France

Fra
 
Birds